Philippine Musical Instruments:
1. Aerophones
 Bulungudyong – vertical flute (Pinatubo Ayta). 
 Palendag – lip-valley flute (Kalinga) 
 Tongali – nose flute (Kalinga)
 Tumpong – bamboo flute
 Tulali – flute with 6 holes
 Bansik - bamboo flute with three holes of the Negrito people in Zambales
 Tambuli - Carabao horn
2. Chordophones
 Litguit – a three-stringed bamboo violin of the Aeta people.
 Butting – a bow with a single hemp 5 string, plucked with a small stick. 
 Faglong – a two-stringed, lute-like instrument of the B'laan. Made in 1997
 Budlong - bamboo zither
 Kolitong - a bamboo zither
 Pas-ing - a two-stringed bamboo with a hole in the middle from Apayao people.
 Lutes
 Bandurria – part of rondalla ensemble, it has a shorter neck and 14-strings compared to its Spanish ancestor.
 Kudyapi – a two-stringed boat lute from Mindanao.
 Laúd – similar to the bandurria, it is ultimately of Spanish origin. Also part of a rondalya ensemble.
 Octavina – part of a rondalya ensemble, it is of ultimately Spanish origin.
3. Membranophones
 Agung a tamlang – bamboo (slit drum)
 Dabakan – goblet drum (Maranao)
 Gandang – double-headed barrel drum (Maranao)
 Libbit – conical drum (Ifugao)
 Sulibao – conical drum (Ibaloi)
 Gambal - war drums
4. Idiophones
 Agung – large gong suspended from an ornate frame
 Bungkaka – bamboo buzzer
 Gandingan – set of four large hanging knobbed gongs
 Kagul – scraper
 Kulintang – set of eight tuned gongs placed horizontally in an ornate frame, tuned pentatonic scale|pentatonically.
 Gabbang – bamboo xylophone (Yakan, Batak, B'laan, Sama-Bajau, Tausūg)
 Luntang – wooden beams hanging from a frame (Maguindanaon)
 Kulintang a tiniok – set of eight, tuned knobbed metal plates strung on a wooden frame (Maguindanaon)
 Babandil- small gong
 Saronay – eight tuned knobbed metal plates strung over a wooden frame (Maranao).
 Tongatong - stamping tubes of the Kalinga people

Philippine musical instruments
Lists of musical instruments
Musical instruments